Mohammad Ishtiyaq Rai (born 2 November 1979) is a Nepali politician, who is currently serving as the Minister for Physical Infrastructure and Transportation in the ruling coalition government led by Prime Minister and Nepali Congress President Sher Bahadur Deuba.

Rai was elected as a Member of Parliament in the House of Representatives from the Banke 2 (constituency) in the 2017 General Elections. In the 2008 Constituent Assembly election he was elected from the Banke-2 constituency, winning 19396 votes.

References 

Nepalese Muslims
Living people
Madhesi Jana Adhikar Forum, Nepal politicians
Place of birth missing (living people)
Nepal MPs 2017–2022
Members of the 1st Nepalese Constituent Assembly
Rastriya Prajatantra Party politicians
People's Socialist Party, Nepal politicians
1979 births